An infield hit is an outcome in baseball in which the batted ball stays in the infield, but neither the batter nor any runners are put out. If the batter and runners reach safely due to an error, it is not considered an infield hit. Runners normally only advance one base on an infield hit, as opposed to a single where the runner from second base frequently comes in to score.

Baseball terminology